Oxatriquinacene is an organic cation with formula .  It is an oxonium ion, with a tricoordinated oxygen atom with +1 charge connected to carbons 1,4, and 7 of a cyclononatriene ring, forming three fused pentagonal cycles. The compound may possess weak tris-homoaromatic character.

Oxatriquinacene has remarkable stability compared to other oxonium cations, although not as extreme as that of the similar oxatriquinane.  It reacts with water, but can be dissolved in acetonitrile.  It is of interest as a possible precursor to oxaacepentalene, a hypothetical neutral aromatic species.

Oxatriquinacene was obtained in 2008 by Mascal and coworkers, through a variant of the synthesis that led them to oxatriquinane.

See also
 Triethyloxonium tetrafluoroborate
 Brookhart's acid
 Pyrylium salt

References

Heterocyclic compounds with 3 rings
Oxygen heterocycles
Oxonium compounds